Carlos Carrizosa Torres (born 22 March 1964) is a Spanish politician and lawyer,  member of the Parliament of Catalonia where he is the spokesperson of Citizens-Party of the Citizenship.

He studied Law at the University of Barcelona and is a member of the Lawyer Association of Barcelona. He is a lawyer in exercise.

He became a member of the Steering Committee of the party in 2011, having been a member before between 2007 and 2009. He was elected member of the Catalan Regional Parliament in the 2012 Catalan Parliament election and re-elected in the 2017 election and the 2021 Catalan regional election.

References

"Information of the Member of Parliament: Carlos Carrizosa Torres", Parliament of Catalonia. Retrieved on 12 July 2013.

1964 births
Living people
Lawyers from Barcelona
Citizens (Spanish political party) politicians
Members of the 11th Parliament of Catalonia
Members of the 12th Parliament of Catalonia
Members of the 10th Parliament of Catalonia
20th-century Spanish lawyers
21st-century Spanish lawyers